Baluwa is a village and former Village Development Committee that is now part of Gokarneshwar Municipality in Kathmandu District in Bagmati Province of central Nepal. At the time of the 2011 Nepal census it had a population of 5,467 and had 1,204 houses in it. It is located at north-east side from the capital city of Nepal. It touch Nuwakot District to the north and Gorkna VDC to the south. In east side, there is Nayapati VDC and in west Kapan VDC.

At the north side, Shivapuri – Nagarjun National Park is located which is the main source of fresh water for the resident of Kathmandu. Bagdwar is the origin of Bagmati river, the Pavitra Nadi (the Holy River) of Hindus. The capital city of Nepal, Kathmandu, is located at the bank of Bagmati River.

References

Populated places in Kathmandu District